Derbyshire is a surname. Notable people with the surname include:

Delia Derbyshire (1937–2001), British musician and composer
Eileen Derbyshire (born 1930), British character actress
Jan Derbyshire, Canadian writer and comedian
James Derbyshire (1882–1945), English footballer
Joe Derbyshire (1883–1946), English footballer
John Derbyshire (born 1945), British-born American author and conservative essayist
John Derbyshire (swimmer) (1878–1938), English Olympian freestyle swimmer and water polo player
Matt Derbyshire (born 1986), English footballer for Nottingham Forest and England U-21
Paul Derbyshire (born 1986), Italian rugby union player
Victoria Derbyshire (born 1968), British journalist and radio broadcaster

References